Kadu bouranee is an Afghan pumpkin dish made by frying pumpkin with different spices. It is topped with chaka/sour cream and dried mint. Kadu bouranee is eaten with bread or rice.

See also
 List of squash and pumpkin dishes

References

Tajik cuisine
Afghan cuisine
Turkish cuisine
Squash and pumpkin dishes
Fried foods